Krugerville is a city in Denton County, Texas, United States. The population was 1,766 in 2020.

Geography

Krugerville is located at  (33.282067, –96.990843).

Demographics

As of the 2020 United States census, there were 1,766 people, 585 households, and 446 families residing in the city.

Education
The city of Krugerville is served by the Aubrey Independent School District.

References

External links
 City of Krugerville official website

Dallas–Fort Worth metroplex
Cities in Texas
Cities in Denton County, Texas